Surachet Pupha is a retired professional footballer from Thailand. He is the elder twin brother of Supachai Phupa. They played in the same team while they were with Suphanburi F.C., Krung Thai Bank F.C., Bangkok Glass F.C.,  Muangthong United F.C., and Chanthaburi F.C.

He was played in Thai Premier League with teams Krung Thai Bank F.C., Bangkok Glass F.C.

Asian Champions League Appearances

References

Living people
Surachet Phupa
1987 births
Surachet Phupa
Surachet Phupa
Surachet Phupa
Twin sportspeople
Association football defenders
Surachet Phupa